The list of ship launches in 1883 includes a chronological list of some ships launched in 1883.



References

Sources

1883
Ship launches
1883 ships